Eman El Gammal is an Egyptian fencer. At the 2008 Olympics, she competed both as an individual and in the Egyptian team, losing in the first round to the Netherlands' Indra Angad-Gaur and the team lost in the first round to Russia.  At the 2012 Summer Olympics she competed in the Women's foil, and was defeated 9-15 in the first round.  The Egyptian women's team that she was part of also lost in the first round.

Her sister Shaimaa El-Gammal was also an Olympic fencer, who competed in the 2000 Olympics, 2004 Olympics, 2008 Olympics and 2012 Olympics.

References

Egyptian female foil fencers
Living people
Olympic fencers of Egypt
Fencers at the 2008 Summer Olympics
Fencers at the 2012 Summer Olympics
Year of birth missing (living people)